Arin is a village in the Vayk Municipality of the Vayots Dzor Province of Armenia. The village was founded in the mid-19th century upon an older site. The village was renamed to Arin in 1978.

References

External links 
 
 
 

Populated places in Vayots Dzor Province